Ixoroideae is a subfamily of flowering plants in the family Rubiaceae and contains about 4000 species in 27 tribes.

Tribes 

 Airospermeae Kainul. & B.Bremer
 Alberteae Hook.f.
 Aleisanthieae Mouly, J.Florence & B.Bremer
 Augusteae Kainul. & B.Bremer
 Bertiereae Bridson
 Coffeeae DC.
 Condamineeae Hook.f.
 Cordiereae A.Rich. ex DC. emend. Mouly
 Cremasporeae Bremek. ex S.P.Darwin
 Crossopterygeae F.White ex Bridson
 Gardenieae A.Rich. ex DC.
 Greeneeae Mouly, J.Florence & B.Bremer
 Henriquezieae Benth. & Hook.f.
 Ixoreae Benth. & Hook.f.
 Jackieae Korth.
 Mussaendeae Hook.f.
 Octotropideae Bedd.
 Pavetteae A.Rich. ex Dumort.
 Posoquerieae Delprete
 Retiniphylleae Hook.f.
 Sabiceeae Bremek.
 Scyphiphoreae Kainul. & B.Bremer
 Sherbournieae Mouly & B.Bremer
 Sipaneeae Bremek.
 Steenisieae Kainul. & B.Bremer
 Trailliaedoxeae Kainul. & B.Bremer
 Vanguerieae A.Rich. ex Dumort.

Classification 
Ixoroideae is a subfamily of the family Rubiaceae. Based on both morphological and molecular characters, Rubiaceae has been divided into three subfamilies - Ixoroideae, Cinchonoideae, and Rubioideae. Ixoroideae and Cinchoinoideae are more closely related. Members of Ixoroideae are morphologically diverse so no shared derived characters have been established for its classification. Introduction of molecular analyses to systematics dramatically improved tribal classification within the subfamily. Present tribal classification within this subfamily is mainly supported through molecular analysis of chloroplast DNA.

Cultivation and use 
Ixoroideae consists of 27 tribes that include several economically valuable genera. Well-known genera within the subfamily include Ixora and Gardenia, both popular ornamentals, but economic value is centered on the genus Coffea, cultivated for coffee production. Three species are generally used for cultivation - Coffea arabica, Coffea robusta, and Coffea liberica

References

External links 

 
Gentianales subfamilies
Taxa named by Constantine Samuel Rafinesque